Saad Muftah Mubarak Al-Kuwari (born 28 March 1964) is a Qatari sprinter. He competed in the men's 200 metres at the 1992 Summer Olympics.

References

1964 births
Living people
Athletes (track and field) at the 1988 Summer Olympics
Athletes (track and field) at the 1992 Summer Olympics
Qatari male sprinters
Olympic athletes of Qatar
Place of birth missing (living people)
Asian Games medalists in athletics (track and field)
Asian Games bronze medalists for Qatar
Athletes (track and field) at the 1994 Asian Games
Athletes (track and field) at the 1998 Asian Games
Medalists at the 1994 Asian Games